PAFE or PafE may refer to:

 the ICAO airport code PAFE for Kake Airport
 Performing Arts for Everyone (PAFE), a program at the John F. Kennedy Center for the Performing Arts
 Proteasome accessory factor E (PafE)